Robert Campbell Wise (born May 21, 1925) is a former Democratic member of the Pennsylvania House of Representatives.

References

Democratic Party members of the Pennsylvania House of Representatives
1925 births
Living people